Theodoriana is a village and former community in the Arta regional unit, Epirus, Greece. Since the 2011 local government reform, it is part of the municipality, Central Tzoumerka, of which it is a municipal unit. The municipal unit has an area of 44.398 km2. In 2011 its population was 163 for the village and 173 for the community (including the village Skarpari).  Northeast is the Trikala regional unit. The Pindos and the Athamanian mountains cross the northeastern part.  The Acheloos river flows by the village along with the GR-30 (Arta - Trikala).

The entire area of Theodoriana are mountains and pine trees along with forests dominate the whole municipality except for the upper parts and the valley areas where farmlands are located.  Some of its residents live only during the summer months and leave during the winter months.  In March 2006, the village and the area was featured on an episode of Travelling in Greece (Menoume Ellada) on ERT.

History
It was founded in 250 BC as Theodoria by Theodorus of Athamania.

In 1793, the historic Monastery of Panagia was built, where during the Turkish occupation it is said that a secret school operated and part of it was turned into a makeshift hospital and a refuge for resistance fighters.

Since 1997, Theodorians were against the construction of hydroelectric dams in the two main rivers of the village by Michaniki SA and Terna Energy SA. In the end, only one of them was built, while for the rest, after a decision of the CoC, their construction was prevented.

In 2011, during the local government reform, it merged with Agnanta, Athamania, and Melissourgoi to form the municipality of Central Tzoumerka.

Population

Climate

External links
Theodoriana on GTP Travel Pages

References

Populated places in Arta (regional unit)